Acaulospora tuberculata is a species of fungus in the family Acaulosporaceae. It forms arbuscular mycorrhiza and vesicles in roots. Found growing in forest soil in Panama, the species was described as new to science in 1982.

References

Diversisporales
Fungi of Central America
Fungi described in 1982